Love Is in the Air is a 2005 French comedy film directed by Rémi Bezançon.

Synopsis
Yann is a boy full of contradictions. All his life is marked by airplanes. A brilliant engineer from the SUPAERO school, he works in aeronautics as an expert in aviation safety. But he developed, following the tragic death of his mother during his birth in flight, an insurmountable fear of flying.
It is this phobia that made him lose his first great love, Charlotte, who went to study in the antipodes and which he never had the courage to join, as he had nevertheless promised her. Since then, he has made a series of conquests but all his stories end in disappointments because he lives in the secret hope of seeing Charlotte one day again. As he approaches his thirties, events rush and Yann loses control. Ludo, his childhood friend whom he was to host for one night, moved into his living room and in the apartment next door Alice, a surprising young woman, a romantic relationship advisor on a radio. Under the pretext of asking her for advice on her personal case, he spends a lot of time with her, which he appreciates. He finally seems ready to draw a line on the past. Until at the bend of a street, he finds the trace of Charlotte.

Cast 
 Vincent Elbaz as Yann Kerbec
 Marion Cotillard as Alice
 Gilles Lellouche as Ludo
 Elsa Kikoïne as Charlotte
 Didier Bezace as Castelot
 Cécile Cassel as Clémence
 Marie Rivière as Charlotte's mother
 Tom Novembre as Yann's father
 Philippe Nahon as Ludo's father
 François Levantal as The Sydney passenger

Accolades

References

External links 

2005 films
2005 comedy films
French comedy films
Films directed by Rémi Bezançon
2005 directorial debut films
2000s French films